The following people were founding figures of Omaha, Nebraska. Their period of influence ranges from 1853 through 1900.

The original founding event to establish the City of Omaha was recorded as a picnic on July 4, 1854. It took place on the hillside that eventually became home of the Nebraska Territory Capitol, and later Omaha Central High School. Some of the figures in attendance at this event are included on this list; others were left off because their influence in the city did not continue afterwards.+  Some of the attendees included Hadley A. Johnson; Alfred D. Jones and his wife; A.J. Hanscom and his wife; William D. Brown and his wife; Thomas Davis and his wife; Frederick Davis and his wife; and a Mr. Seely and his wife.

Others in the following list were members of the Old Settlers' Association and/or the Omaha Claim Club. Many were buried at the Prospect Hill Cemetery in North Omaha.

Founding figures

See also
 History of Omaha
 List of mayors of Omaha
 List of people from Omaha, Nebraska
 Kountze family (category)
 Creighton family (category)

References

 
American pioneers
Omaha, Nebraska-related lists
People by era in Nebraska
American city founders